The meridian 29° west of Greenwich is a line of longitude that extends from the North Pole across the Arctic Ocean, Greenland, the Atlantic Ocean, the Southern Ocean, and Antarctica to the South Pole.

The 29th meridian west forms a great circle with the 151st meridian east.

From Pole to Pole
Starting at the North Pole and heading south to the South Pole, the 29th meridian west passes through:

{| class="wikitable plainrowheaders"
! scope="col" width="125" | Co-ordinates
! scope="col" | Country, territory or sea
! scope="col" | Notes
|-
| style="background:#b0e0e6;" | 
! scope="row" style="background:#b0e0e6;" | Arctic Ocean
| style="background:#b0e0e6;" |
|-
| style="background:#b0e0e6;" | 
! scope="row" style="background:#b0e0e6;" | Bliss Bay
| style="background:#b0e0e6;" |
|-
| 
! scope="row" | 
| Johannes V. Jensen Land (Northern Peary Land)
|-
| style="background:#b0e0e6;" | 
! scope="row" style="background:#b0e0e6;" | Frederick E. Hyde Fjord
| style="background:#b0e0e6;" |
|-
| 
! scope="row" | 
| Melville Land (Southern Peary Land)
|-
| style="background:#b0e0e6;" | 
! scope="row" style="background:#b0e0e6;" | Independence Fjord
| style="background:#b0e0e6;" |
|-
| 
! scope="row" | 
|
|-valign="top"
| style="background:#b0e0e6;" | 
! scope="row" style="background:#b0e0e6;" | Atlantic Ocean
| style="background:#b0e0e6;" | Passing just west of Faial Island, Azores,  (at ) Passing just west of the island of Martim Vaz,  (at ) Passing just east of the island of Trindade,  (at )
|-
| style="background:#b0e0e6;" | 
! scope="row" style="background:#b0e0e6;" | Southern Ocean
| style="background:#b0e0e6;" |
|-valign="top"
| 
! scope="row" | Antarctica
|-
|}

See also
28th meridian west
30th meridian west

w029 meridian west